Joel Jansson (10 July 1924 to 15 February 2018) was an international motorcycle speedway rider from Sweden.

Speedway career 
Jansson reached the final of the Speedway World Championship in the 1958 Individual Speedway World Championship. He rode for Vargarna in Sweden from 1957 to 1962 and was the captain of the Vargarna team from 1958.

World Final appearances

Individual World Championship
 1958 –  London, Wembley Stadium – 16th - 0pts

Family
His two sons (Tommy Jansson and Bosse Jansson) were both speedway riders; tragically Tommy was killed in 1976, during the Swedish final.

References 

1924 births
2018 deaths
Swedish speedway riders